Mustafa Monwar (born 1 September 1935) is a Bangladeshi artist. He is a painter, sculptor, radio performer and professor of fine arts. He is currently the chairman of Bangladesh Shishu Academy. He was awarded Ekushey Padak in 2004 by the Government of Bangladesh.

Early life
Monwar is the son of poet Golam Mostofa. He passed his matriculation exam from Narayanganj Government High School. He was initially admitted to the Scottish Church College of the University of Calcutta where he studied science. Following the advice of the author Syed Mujtaba Ali, he transferred to the Government College of Art & Craft, Kolkata from where he graduated obtaining best result in his class.

Career
Monwar started his career as lecturer at the East Pakistan College of Arts and Crafts. Later, he joined Bangladesh Television (BTV) as director general. Later he became the director general of the Bangladesh Shilpakala Academy and the National Media Institute. He also served as a managing director of the FDC.

Works
During the liberation war of Bangladesh in 1971, he organized puppet shows at the refugee camps in West Bengal. His created puppet plays like Agachha (Weed), Rakkhash (Monster) and A Brave Farmer. He was known as the "Puppet Man of Bangladesh". American documentary filmmaker Lear Levin visited Bangladesh to make a film on his puppets. These scenes were later added to Tareque Masud's film Muktir Gaan (1995).

Monwar's television puppet show Moner Kotha ran on BTV for 12 years. It tells the story of a little girl called Parul and her seven brothers named Champa who were cursed and turned into flowers. It is based on the folklore Saat Bhai Champa. He runs Dhaka-based organization Educational Puppet Development Centre (EPDC).

Monwar's teleplays include The Taming of the Shrew by William Shakespeare and Raktokorobi by Rabindranath Tagore. He showcased his own interpretations of Hans Christian Andersen's The Nightingale, and The Ugly Duckling. He is the Bangladesh representative of the Denmark-based International Puppet Development Centre.

Personal life
Monwar has been married to Merry Monwar since 1965. Together they had one daughter, Nandini Monwar and one son, Sadat Monwar.

Awards
 All India Fine Arts Competition Award (1957)
 Zainul Abedin Gold Medal
 Ekushey Padak (2004)
 Anando Bichitra Award (2004)
 The Daily Star and Standard Chartered Bank Lifetime Achievement Award Winner (2017)

References

1935 births
Living people
People from Jessore District
Bangladeshi painters
Bangladeshi sculptors
Puppeteers
Scottish Church College alumni
Government College of Art & Craft alumni
University of Calcutta alumni
Academic staff of the University of Dhaka
Recipients of the Ekushey Padak in arts
Honorary Fellows of Bangla Academy
Meril-Prothom Alo Lifetime Achievement Award winners